Mariusz Szyszko (born 8 March 1969) is a Polish volleyball player. He competed in the men's tournament at the 1996 Summer Olympics.

References

External links
 

1969 births
Living people
Sportspeople from Olsztyn
Polish men's volleyball players
Olympic volleyball players of Poland
Volleyball players at the 1996 Summer Olympics
AZS Olsztyn players
20th-century Polish people